Cheap Thrills is a compilation album by Frank Zappa, with material from previously released albums.

The album spent five weeks on the UK Top 100 Chart, peaking at 83.

Track listing
All tracks by Frank Zappa, except where noted.

"I Could Be a Star Now" (from The True Story of Frank Zappa's 200 Motels (Film), 1988 & Playground Psychotics, 1992)
"Catholic Girls [Live]" (from You Can't Do That on Stage Anymore, Vol. 6, 1992)
"Bobby Brown Goes Down [Live]" (from You Can't Do That on Stage Anymore, Vol. 3, 1989)
"You Are What You Is" (Remix) (from Thing-Fish, 1984; originally from You Are What You Is, 1981)
"We Are Not Alone" (from The Man from Utopia, 1983)
"Cheap Thrills" (from Cruising with Ruben & the Jets, 1968)
"The Mudshark Interview" (credited as Frank Zappa, Mothers of Invention) (from Playground Psychotics)
"Hot Plate Heaven at the Green Hotel" (from Broadway the Hard Way, 1988 & Does Humor Belong in Music?, 1986)
"Zomby Woof (Live)" (from You Can't Do That on Stage Anymore, Vol. 1, 1988)
"The Torture Never Stops (Original version)" (from You Can't Do That on Stage Anymore, Vol. 4, 1991)
"Joe's Garage (Live)" (from You Can't Do That on Stage Anymore, Vol. 3)
"My Guitar Wants to Kill Your Mama (Live)" (from You Can't Do That on Stage Anymore, Vol. 4)
"Going for the Money" (from The True Story of 200 Motels & Playground Psychotics)

Credits
 Original recordings produced by FZ.
 Compiled by the original Joe Black.
 Intramural sports by David Greenberg.
 Sampler mastered by Toby Mountain.
 Pre-taping audience warm-up by David Baker.
 'Artwerks' by Cal Schenkel.

References

1998 compilation albums
Frank Zappa compilation albums
Rykodisc compilation albums